Bette Ford (born Harriet Elizabeth Dingeldein; June 24, 1927) is an American actress and model turned professional bullfighter. She was the first American woman to fight on foot in the Plaza México, the world's largest bullfight arena.

Personal life
Shortly after moving to New York at the age of 18, she married another actor, David Ford, whose name she would keep, although the marriage ended after nine months. She later married John Meston (July 30, 1914 – March 24, 1979) an American radio and television writer best known for co-creating (with Norman Macdonnell), the long-running radio/TV series, Gunsmoke. Ford's third and current husband is Scott Wolkoff (born May 27, 1947), some two decades her junior.

Early modeling and acting career
Born as Harriet Elizabeth Dingeldein in McKeesport, Pennsylvania in 1927, she and her brother were raised by relatives after being abandoned, first by their mother and then later by their father. After graduating from high school in 1945, she began her career as a model and actress in New York, where her modeling credits included stints as the Jantzen Bathing Suit Girl, the Camay Bride, and the Parliament Cigarette Girl, and her acting credits included appearances as a regular on The Jackie Gleason Show and The Jimmy Durante Show.

Bullfighting career
While on a modeling photo shoot in Bogotá, Colombia, Ford was introduced to the renowned matador Luis Miguel Dominguín and watched him fight in the ring. Soon after, Ford left New York for Mexico to train as a bullfighter. In 1954, Warner Bros made a documentary short about her training, Beauty and the Bull.

Her historic debut at the Plaza México was followed by several years of fighting as a figura (bullfighting celebrity) in Mexico and the Philippines. The studio MGM, which had offered her an acting contract before she left New York to become a bullfighter, planned a full-length feature film based on her life story, and sent several writers, among them John Meston, the co-creator of Gunsmoke, to meet with Ford and discuss a screenplay. Ford married Meston shortly after they met and then retired as a bullfighter.

Post-bullfighting acting career
Ford has appeared in feature films including the Clint-Eastwood-directed Sudden Impact and Honkytonk Man, and television series including Cheers, L.A. Law, Melrose Place, and Felicity. Her voice can be heard in The Animatrix, the companion animated DVD of the film trilogy The Matrix, and numerous commercials.

Selected filmography

 Beauty and the Bull  (1954, Short) .... Bette Ford
 Death Valley Days (1968, TV Series) .... Millie
 Emergency! (1977, TV Series) .... Juen Edwards
 James at 15 (1977, TV Series) .... Mrs. Droste
 Honkytonk Man (1982) .... Lulu 
 Falcon Crest (1983, TV Series) .... Prison Guard
 Sudden Impact (1983) .... Leah 
 Emerald Point N.A.S. (1984, TV Series) .... Mrs. Randolph
 St. Elsewhere (1984, TV Series) .... Pat Kroll
 Cheers (1984, TV Series) .... Irene Blanchard
 Crazy Like a Fox (1985, TV Series) 
 Hotel (1985, TV Series) .... Mrs. Fielding
 Crime Story (1987, TV Series) .... Angie / Bartender
 A Year in the Life (1987, TV Series) .... Jackie
 L.A. Law (1987-1988, TV Series) .... Rusty Farrell
 Major Dad (1989, TV Series) ... Mom
 Hunter (1990, TV Series) ... Anna Scarlatti
 The Fresh Prince of Bel-Air (1990, TV Series) ... Madame Chatchka
 Marked for Death (1990) .... Kate Hatcher 
 Lucy & Desi: Before the Laughter (1991) .... DeDe Ball
 The Commish (1992, TV Series) .... Irene Wallerstein
 The Wonder Years (1992, TV Series) ... Aunt Muriel
 Melrose Place (1993, TV Series) .... Mrs. Wilson
 Tales from the Crypt (1994, TV Series) .... Mrs. Peterson
 Season of Change (1994) .... Granny Upton
 Thunder Alley (1995, TV Series) .... Wanda
 Party of Five (1995, TV Series) .... Miss Corso
 It Was Him or Us (1995, TV Movie) .... Maggie Shepard
 A Face to Die For (1996, TV Movie) .... Mrs. Berman
 Nash Bridges (1996, TV Series)
 Promised Land .... (1997, TV Series) .... Marie Jasper
 A River Made to Drown In (1997) .... Lady with Whip 
 The Landlady (1998) .... Justine Welch
 Two Guys, a Girl and a Pizza Place (1998, TV Series) .... Marge Ryecart 
 My Engagement Party (1998) .... Estelle Salsburg
 Providence (1999, TV Series) .... Hildy
 ER (2001, TV Series) .... Princess Taffeta
 Felicity (2001, TV Series) .... Professor May
 The Division (2002, TV Series) .... Mrs. Sanders
 Final Flight of the Osiris (2003, Short) .... Old Woman (English version, voice)
 The Animatrix (2003) .... Old Woman (segment "Final Flight of the Osiris") (voice)
 Valley of the Sun (2011) .... Bunny McGill

See also
 Patricia McCormick (1927–2013), American woman professional bullfighter
 List of female bullfighters

Notes

External links
"La Estocada" (interviewed by Fortunato Salazar in Guernica magazine, 2011); accessed December 29, 2016.
"Bette Ford: Story of a Lady Bullfighter" (Bette Ford interviewed by "Gus O'Shaugn" in the Village Voice, 1955); accessed April 27, 2016.

1927 births
Living people
American bullfighters
Female bullfighters
People from McKeesport, Pennsylvania
Sportspeople from Pittsburgh
Actresses from Pittsburgh
Female models from Pennsylvania
American television actresses
American expatriates in Mexico
21st-century American women